Trematosphaeria is a genus of fungi in the family Melanommataceae; according to the 2007 Outline of Ascomycota, the placement in this family is uncertain.

References

Melanommataceae
Taxa named by Karl Wilhelm Gottlieb Leopold Fuckel